The 1862 Hampden by-election was a by-election held  on 14 June 1862 in the  electorate during the 3rd New Zealand Parliament.

The by-election was caused by the resignation of the incumbent, Thomas Fraser, on 30 April 1862. He had been vacated for absence.

James Williamson was declared elected unopposed, as he was the only candidate nominated. Julius Vogel was also nominated, but declined.

References 

Hampden 1862
1862 elections in New Zealand
December 1862 events
Politics of Otago